Bypro is an unincorporated community and coal town in Floyd County, Kentucky, United States. Their post office closed in 2004. It was also known as Coal.

References

Unincorporated communities in Floyd County, Kentucky
Unincorporated communities in Kentucky
Coal towns in Kentucky